Hopea vacciniifolia is a tree in the family Dipterocarpaceae, native to Borneo. The specific epithet vacciniifolia refers to the leaves' similarity to those of the genus Vaccinium.

Description
It has flying (detached) buttresses and stilt roots. The bark is smooth.

Distribution and habitat
Hopea vacciniifolia is endemic to Borneo. Its habitat is kerangas forests.

Conservation
Hopea vacciniifolia has been assessed as endangered on the IUCN Red List. It is threatened by conversion of land for oil palm and other plantations. It is also threatened by logging for its timber. The species is found in some protected areas.

References

vacciniifolia
Endemic flora of Borneo
Plants described in 1962